I. grandis may refer to:
 Idiops grandis, a spider species in the genus Idiops found in South Africa
 Inula grandis, a flowering plant species in the genus Inula
 Isodictya grandis, the flat leaf sponge, a marine demosponge species endemic to the west coast of South Africa to False Bay

See also
 Grandis (disambiguation)